Battlefield Germany is a turn-based strategy video game developed and published by Personal Software Services for the Commodore 64 released in April 1987. It was also ported to the Amstrad CPC and ZX Spectrum later that year. It is the eighth instalment to the Strategic Wargames series. The game is set during a fictional scenario in which the powers of NATO and the Warsaw Pact engage in a conventional war throughout Europe, mostly centring in West and East Germany.

The game is a turn-based strategy and focuses on the player building and training units that are used to attack the opposing side. The game was released for 8-bit consoles as well as 16-bit consoles.  Battlefield Germany received mixed reviews upon release. Reviewers mainly criticised the tempo of the gameplay and lack of innovation from the original. Some critics, however, praised the graphics and viewed the hard difficulty favourably.

Gameplay

The game is a turn-based strategy and revolves around a fictional conflict between the powers of NATO and the Warsaw Pact. The player has the choice of choosing to control either NATO or Warsaw Pact forces at the beginning of the game. The player will begin the game on either side of Europe depending on which side was chosen; if NATO was picked, the player will start at western European countries (France, West Germany, Denmark) whereas if the player sides with the Warsaw Pact, the game will begin in eastern Europe. The map is hexagon-shaped and allows the player to move their units in six directions. Each side has a variety of units; infantry move at a slower pace than mechanised infantry however armoured units are able to withstand more damage than regular units. The game displays two maps on screen; the larger, central map displays the current situation whereas a smaller map to the corner of the screen displays a mini-map of Europe, which runs north from Denmark to southern France.

There are seven types of units in the game. Each unit has a set of statistics which is displayed in the interface once selected. The statistics range from combat strength, fatigue, efficiency, supply and movement points. During the game, both sides have the option to request air support that can be used to attack enemy units. If the other side uses their air support, the player will be given a warning of an oncoming air strike and will have the option to retreat. The game has two endings depending on the side chosen. If playing as NATO, the main objective is to stall Soviet forces long enough until American reinforcements arrive. However, if playing as the Warsaw Pact, the objective is to destroy all NATO forces.

Setting
The events leading up the stand-off between NATO and the Warsaw Pact are detailed in a pre-game text; Iran declares war on Iraq and subsequently invades the latter nation, whilst Egypt succumbs to a civil war and establishes Islamic law over the country, culminating in an Egyptian invasion of Israel. The events in the Middle East prompt the superpowers of the United States and the British Empire to intervene, leading up to a conventional war in Europe against the Eastern bloc. The game is set in 1987.

Background
Personal Software Services was founded in Coventry, England, by Gary Mays and Richard Cockayne in 1981. The company were known for creating games that revolved around historic war battles and conflicts, such as Theatre Europe, Bismark and Falklands '82. The company had a partnership with French video game developer ERE Informatique, and published localised versions of their products to the United Kingdom. In 1986, Cockayne took a decision to alter their products for release on 16-bit consoles, as he found that smaller 8-bit consoles such as the ZX Spectrum lacked the processing power for larger strategy games. The decision was falsely interpreted as "pull-out" from the Spectrum market by a video game journalist. Following years of successful sales throughout the mid 1980s, Personal Software Services experienced financial difficulties, in what Cockayne admitted in a retrospective interview that "he took his eye off the ball". The company was acquired by Mirrorsoft in February 1987, and was later dispossessed by the company due to strains of debt.

Reception

The game received mixed reviews upon release. Richard Blaine of Your Sinclair praised the graphics as "wonderful" and the gameplay as "tough", adding that the game should be aimed at advanced players. Philippa Irving of Crash criticised the graphics as repetitively "dull", despite admitting that they were "clear enough" visually. Gary Rook of Sinclair User heralded the graphics as "superb", adding that the game was one of the "best looking" wargames he had ever seen at that time. A reviewer of Computer and Video Games criticised the presentation, stating that the screen was too small and the lack of visual understanding made the game "completely unplayable". Mark Reed of Computer Gamer praised the graphics as being superior compared to Theatre Europe, heralding it as "much more detailed". However, Reed criticised the originality of the game and the lack of manual for the ZX Spectrum version.

A reviewer of ZX Computing praised the game's difficulty, suggesting that it was "recommended" for advanced gamers in the wargame genre. Irving criticised the game's value for money and playability, stating that £12.95 was "a lot" of money to spend on a game that the player would most likely dislike. However, Rook heralded the gameplay as "smooth" and "challenging", contrary to other critics.

References

External links
Battlefield Germany at WorldofSpectrum
Battlefield Germany at IGDB.com

1987 video games
Amstrad CPC games
Commodore 64 games
Single-player video games
Turn-based strategy video games
Video games developed in the United Kingdom
Video games set in 1987
Alternate history video games
Video games set in Germany
ZX Spectrum games
Cold War video games
Personal Software Services games